"Are You Right There Father Ted?" is the first episode of the third series of the Channel 4 television sitcom Father Ted, and the 18th episode overall. It is notable for being the first episode aired after the death of Dermot Morgan, who had died hours after filming for the final episode had been completed. As a mark of respect to Morgan, the original transmission of the first episode was delayed by a week.

Plot 
In the cold opening, Ted has been promoted to a luxurious Dublin parish, and is quite happy with the living arrangements, which he considers much better than on cold, rainy Craggy Island. However, a church accountant soon asks Ted about a discrepancy with the church expenses. Ted is subsequently sent straight back to Craggy Island.

Ted goes to collect a copy of a book he had given to Father Seamus Fitzpatrick, and surprised to see his collection of Nazi and Third Reich memorabilia. Returning to the parish, Ted finds that Mrs. Doyle has fallen and injured her back, so he and Dougal are required to take over the cleaning duties. The two become quickly bored, and to liven the mood, Ted puts a lampshade on his head, giving the appearance of a coolie hat, and does an offensive impression of a Chinese person, only to then turn around to see the Yin family, a Chinese family living on the island, watching him from outside. Dougal tells Ted that Craggy Island has a Chinese community, a fact that Ted did not previously know. Ted catches up with the Yin family just before they leave in their car and comes up with a story to provide an excuse for his actions. He later leaves the house again to go shopping and discovers that rumours that he is a racist are spreading across the island.

Ted tries to disprove the rumours but his explanations are either rejected or hampered by ill luck. At one point, Ted stands at the window, which has a perfectly square black piece of dirt on it, and waves to the Yin family, whom he invited round to convince them that he is not a racist. However, from outside, the dirt makes Ted appear to have a toothbrush moustache similar to Adolf Hitler's, and his gestures appear similar to Hitler's. The Yins leave, angering Ted.

Ted decides the only way to put things right is to hold a celebration of the diversity of Craggy Island at a local pub. While his laughable presentation is mocked at, the Yins gracefully accept his apology in part for the free alcohol. In the meanwhile, Father Fitzpatrick has died suddenly (after accidentally ingesting cyanide instead of valium) and left his collection of Nazi memorabilia to Ted via mail, which Mrs. Doyle unpacks. After the bar closes, Ted brings back the Yins for a nightcap at the parochial house, only to discover that Mrs Doyle put the entire collection of Nazi memorabilia on full display in the living room. Ted says that he can explain everything, only to then realise that actually, he can't.

The next day, Ted calls the Yin family to tell them about a large package of whiskey that he sent them as a further apology, but says that there has been a "change of plan". Father Jack then emerges from the box in an SS uniform, having drunk all of the liquor.

In the book Father Ted: The Complete Scripts, Arthur Mathews observes that the islanders' actions in this episode are the opposite of those in "The Passion of Saint Tibulus": in the earlier episode, they completely fail to do what Ted wants them to, while in this episode they enthusiastically follow what they imagine to be Ted's example, even though he desperately wants them not to.

References

External links

1998 British television episodes
Father Ted episodes
Television episodes about neo-Nazism
Television episodes about racism